As was the custom since 1930, the 1948 Tour de France was contested by national and regional teams. After there had not been an official Italian team allowed in the previous edition, the Italians were back. The Italian cyclists was divided between Gino Bartali and Fausto Coppi. Both argued in the preparation for the race about who would be the team leader. The Tour organisation wanted to have both cyclists in the race, so they allowed the Italians and Belgians to enter a second team. In the end, Coppi refused to participate, and Bartali became the team leader. The organisation still allowed the Italians and Belgians to enter a second team, but they were to be composed of young cyclists, and were named the Italian Cadets and the Belgian Aiglons.

The Tour organisation invited the Swiss to send a team, as they wanted Ferdinand Kübler, the winner of the 1948 Tour de Suisse, in the race. Kübler refused this because he could earn more money in other races. When the brothers Georges and Roger Aeschlimann announced that they wanted to join the race, they were quickly accepted, especially because they were from Lausanne, where the Tour would pass through. They were put in a team with eight non-French cyclists living in France, and were named the Internationals.

Twelve teams of ten cyclists entered the race: Belgium, Dutch/Luxembourg, Internationals, Italy, France, Belgian Aiglons, Italian Cadets, Centre–South-West, Ile de France–France-North-East, West-France, Paris and France-South-East. There were 60 French cyclists, 24 Italian, 22 Belgian, 6 Dutch, 4 Luxembourgian, 2 Swiss, 1 Polish and 1 Algerian cyclist.

Start list

By team

By rider

By nationality

Notes 
1.The French naturalisation of Giuseppe Tacca, under the name of Pierre Tacca, became official during the Tour de France, on 2 July 1948.

References

1948 Tour de France
1948